William Glynne may refer to:
William Glynne (MP) (1566–1620), MP for Anglesey, 1593
Sir William Glynne, 1st Baronet (1638–1690), MP for Carnarvon, 1660
Sir William Glynne, 2nd Baronet (1663–1721), MP for Oxford University, 1698–1700, and Woodstock, 1702–1705
Sir William Glynne, 5th Baronet (c. 1710–1730)
William Glynne Charles Gladstone (1885–1915), Liberal Party politician
William Glyn (bishop) (1504–1558), bishop of Bangor
William Glynne (priest), Welsh Anglican priest

See also 

Glynne baronets